Matthew Nicks (born 13 May 1975) is a former professional Australian Football League player and currently the senior coach of the Adelaide Football Club. He was recruited from the West Adelaide Football Club to the Sydney Swans with the 21st selection in the 1994 AFL Draft.

Playing career

Sydney Swans
Nicks made his Australian Football League debut in 1996 for the Sydney Swans and played a total of 175 games over the next 10 seasons. He retired from AFL football in 2005 after prolonged struggles with injury and illness, including a broken leg in 1995, pneumonia in 2000, a broken finger in 2001 and a stress fracture in his leg in 2005. His second last game was the round 10, 2005 match against  at Marvel Stadium in which the Swans came under severe scrutiny from the AFL, in particular from then-CEO Andrew Demetriou and Network 10 commentators Stephen Quartermain, Tim Lane and Robert Walls, over their performance.

Coaching career

Port Adelaide Football Club assistant coach (2011-2018)
Nicks joined the Port Adelaide Football Club in 2011 as a club development coach in an assistant coaching position under senior coach Matthew Primus until the end of 2012 season, during which time the Power struggled towards the bottom part of the ladder, finishing 16th and 14th in 2011 and 2012 respectively. From 2013 to 2015, he served as the club's backline coach under senior coach Ken Hinkley and in 2016, he served as the forwards coach under senior coach Hinkley. In 2017, Nicks was named as Port Adelaide's senior assistant coach under senior coach Hinkley. Nicks left the Port Adelaide Football Club at the end of the 2018 season.

Greater Western Sydney Giants assistant coach (2019)
Nicks joined the GWS Giants as a senior assistant coach under senior coach Leon Cameron for the 2019 season.

Adelaide Football Club senior coach (2019-present)
In October 2019, Nicks was named new senior coach of the Adelaide Football Club, shortly after previous senior coach Don Pyke announced his departure. Due to a variety of reasons, including the COVID-19 pandemic, the club entering a rebuild at his arrival, and the lack of experienced assistant coaches at Adelaide, the Crows under Nicks slumped to a 0-13 start to the 2020 season, leading to Nicks being called “the least supported coach” in Adelaide’s history. He won his first game as Adelaide Football Club senior coach when the Crows defeated  by 35 points in round 15, 2020.

Player statistics
 Statistics are correct to end of career

|- style="background:#eaeaea;"
! scope="row" style="text-align:center" | 1996
| style="text-align:center" | 
| 36 || 6 || 2 || 1 || 25 || 11 || 36 || 12 || 8 || 0.3 || 0.2 || 4.2 || 1.8 || 6.0 || 2.0 || 1.3 || 0
|- 
! scope="row" style="text-align:center" | 1997
| style="text-align:center" | 
| 23 || 20 || 6 || 3 || 150 || 99 || 249 || 59 || 26 || 0.3 || 0.2 || 7.5 || 5.0 || 12.5 || 3.0 || 1.3 || 0
|- style="background:#eaeaea;"
! scope="row" style="text-align:center" | 1998
| style="text-align:center" | 
| 23 || 24 || 10 || 5 || 291 || 138 || 429 || 104 || 42 || 0.4 || 0.2 || 12.1 || 5.8 || 17.9 || 4.3 || 1.8 || 9
|- 
! scope="row" style="text-align:center" | 1999
| style="text-align:center" | 
| 23 || 23 || 9 || 5 || 263 || 123 || 386 || 106 || 26 || 0.4 || 0.2 || 11.4 || 5.3 || 16.8 || 4.6 || 1.1 || 4
|- style="background:#eaeaea;"
! scope="row" style="text-align:center" | 2000
| style="text-align:center" | 
| 23 || 19 || 13 || 13 || 229 || 86 || 315 || 107 || 29 || 0.7 || 0.7 || 12.0 || 4.5 || 16.6 || 5.6 || 1.5 || 6
|- 
! scope="row" style="text-align:center" | 2001
| style="text-align:center" | 
| 23 || 18 || 16 || 21 || 186 || 70 || 256 || 89 || 32 || 1.4 || 1.2 || 10.3 || 3.9 || 14.2 || 4.9 || 1.8 || 9
|- player for the buglers 2018-
|- style="background:#eaeaea;"
! scope="row" style="text-align:center" | 2002
| style="text-align:center" | 
| 23 || 21 || 28 || 18 || 186 || 72 || 258 || 86 || 51 || 1.3 || 0.9 || 8.9 || 3.4 || 12.3 || 4.1 || 2.4 || 3
|- 
! scope="row" style="text-align:center" | 2003
| style="text-align:center" | 
| 23 || 18 || 16 || 11 || 125 || 57 || 182 || 62 || 34 || 0.9 || 0.6 || 6.9 || 3.2 || 10.1 || 3.4 || 1.9 || 0
|- 
|- style="background:#eaeaea;"
! scope="row" style="text-align:center" | 2004
| style="text-align:center" | 
| 23 || 17 || 14 || 5 || 128 || 56 || 184 || 65 || 36 || 0.8 || 0.3 || 7.5 || 3.3 || 10.8 || 3.8 || 2.1 || 0
|- 
! scope="row" style="text-align:center" | 2005
| style="text-align:center" | 
| 23 || 9 || 1 || 2 || 58 || 27 || 85 || 26 || 22 || 0.1 || 0.2 || 6.4 || 3.0 || 9.4 || 2.9 || 2.4 || 0
|- class="sortbottom"
! colspan=3| Career
! 175
! 125
! 84
! 1641
! 2380
! 2023
! 716
! 306
! 0.7
! 0.5
! 9.4
! 4.2
! 13.6
! 4.1
! 1.7
! 31
|}

Coaching statistics
 Statistics are correct to the end of the 2022 season.

|- style="background-color: #EAEAEA"
| scope=row style="text-align:center; font-weight:normal" | 2020
|
| 17 || 3 || 14 || 0 || 17.6% || 18 || 18
|-
! scope="row" style="text-align:center; font-weight:normal" | 2021
|
| 22 || 7 || 15 || 0 || 31.8% || 15 || 18
|- style="background-color: #EAEAEA"
| scope=row style="text-align:center; font-weight:normal" | 2022
|
| 22 || 8 || 14 || 0 || 36.4% || 14 || 18
|- class="sortbottom"
! colspan=2| Career totals
! 61 !! 18 !! 43 !! 0 !! 29.5% !! 15.6
! colspan=2|
|}

References

External links

Australian rules footballers from South Australia
Sydney Swans players
West Adelaide Football Club players
1975 births
Living people
Australia international rules football team players